George Michael Babich (April 4, 1918 – July 22, 1984) was an American professional wrestler and college basketball head coach. He had a school hall of fame basketball career at Fordham, but also played for their football team. Babich entered professional wrestling in the 1940s and continued through the 1950s. Between 1946 and 1949 he also served as Saint Peter's basketball head coach.

Head coaching record

References

1918 births
1984 deaths
Basketball coaches from New York (state)
Fordham Rams football players
Fordham Rams men's basketball players
Saint Peter's Peacocks men's basketball coaches
Basketball players from New York City
Players of American football from New York (state)
Professional wrestlers from New York (state)
American men's basketball players
20th-century professional wrestlers
Professional wrestlers from New York City